Idalus tumara is a moth of the family Erebidae. It was described by William Schaus in 1921. It is found in Guyana.

References

tumara
Moths described in 1921